City of Endless Night is a thriller novel by Douglas Preston and Lincoln Child. The book was released on January 16, 2018, by Grand Central Publishing. This is the seventeenth book in the Special Agent Pendergast series.

Reception
The book entered The New York Times Fiction Best Seller list on February 4, 2018. A reviewer of Kirkus Reviews wrote "One of the best in the series—tense and tightly wound, with death relentlessly circling, stalking, lurking behind every shadow". A reviewer of Publishers Weekly mentioned "Though the minimization of Pendergast’s complex backstory makes this entry more accessible to newcomers, the authors fail to generate their usual high level of suspense. The climax will strike fans as too familiar."

References

External links

2018 American novels
American thriller novels
Collaborative novels
Grand Central Publishing books
Novels by Douglas Preston
Novels by Lincoln Child
Sequel novels